The Tip Off (also written as The Tip-Off) is a 1929 American silent crime drama film directed by Leigh Jason and starring Bill Cody, George Hackathorne and Duane Thompson. It was shot at Universal Studios, just as the company was producing its last silents amidst the conversion to sound. It was originally registered under the working title The Stool Pigeon, but this was changed possibly due to the similarity to Columbia's Stool Pigeon. In Britain it was released under the alternative title Underworld Love.

Synopsis
Riley, a crook is on the run from the law with his associated Jimmy Lamar. They shelter with Riley's girlfriend Annie, a fortune teller. She falls for Lamar, who is planning to go straight. Once he discovers this Riley pressures Lamar into a new job, intending to frame him up. However, Annie forsees this in her crystal ball and warns Lamar.

Cast
 Bill Cody as Jimmy Lamar
 George Hackathorne as 	'Shrimp' Riley
 Duane Thompson as 	Crystal Annie
 L.J. O'Connor as	Capt. McHugh
 Jack Singleton as Confidence Man
 Robert Bolder as Duke
 Monte Montague as 	Negro
 Walter Shumway as 	Stock Salesman

References

Bibliography
 Munden, Kenneth White. The American Film Institute Catalog of Motion Pictures Produced in the United States, Part 1. University of California Press, 1997.

External links
 

1929 films
1929 drama films
1920s English-language films
American silent feature films
Silent American drama films
American black-and-white films
Films directed by Leigh Jason
Universal Pictures films
1920s American films